Louis Lagueux (November 20, 1793 – June 15, 1832) was a lawyer and political figure in Lower Canada.

He was born in the town of Quebec in 1793, the son of merchant Louis Lagueux and Louise Bégin, whose father Charles Bégin served in the legislative assembly. Lagueux studied at the Petit Séminaire de Québec, articled in law with Joseph-Rémi Vallières de Saint-Réal and qualified to practice in 1817. That same year, he entered the importing business with a partner; after that business failed the following year, he returned to the practice of law. In 1820, he was elected to the Legislative Assembly of Lower Canada for Dorchester; he represented the riding until his death at Quebec from cholera in 1832. During his time in the assembly, he supported the Parti canadien. In 1830, he introduced a bill incorporating the city of Quebec.

His uncle Étienne-Claude Lagueux also served in the legislative assembly.

References 
 
 

1793 births
1832 deaths
Infectious disease deaths in Quebec
Members of the Legislative Assembly of Lower Canada
Deaths from cholera
19th-century Canadian lawyers